Bolel is a style of Ethiopian music that evolved out of the Azmari musical tradition in Addis Ababa and elements of modern urban culture.  The word bolel is a corrupted form of the word meaning dust, in reference to the bad roads of the rural countryside.

References 

 NationMedia.com
 Falceto, Francis. "Land of Wax and Gold". 2000. In Broughton, Simon and Ellingham, Mark with McConnachie, James and Duane, Orla (Ed.), World Music, Vol. 1: Africa, Europe and the Middle East, pp 480–487. Rough Guides Ltd, Penguin Books. 

Ethiopian music